Lord John Douglas-Montagu-Scott (13 July 1809 – 3 January 1860) was a 19th-century landlord and MP for Roxburghshire. He was the third son of the 4th Duke of Buccleuch and younger brother to the 5th Duke of Buccleuch. He inherited his residence at Cawston in Warwickshire. In March 1836 he married Alicia Spottiswoode but died childless.

Election results

Labrador Retrievers
Outside public life Lord John Scott was a keen fisherman, hunter, and yachtsman. In the 1830s, he  together with his brother the 5th Duke of Buccleuch and his uncle, the 10th Earl of Home were among the first to import Newfoundland dogs  for use as gundogs. These dogs are considered to be the progenitors of modern Labradors.

Statue

A statue of Scott, by Joseph Durham, stands in the centre of Dunchurch, Warwickshire.

At Christmas, it has been an annual tradition for a group of pranksters to secretly dress up the statue in the garb of a cartoon or TV character overnight. They have done this every Christmas for more than 30 years, More recently the statue was dressed up as an Olympian for the final leg of the Olympic torch relay sporting a headband and runners jersey.

The statue was dressed up as Queen Elizabeth II during her diamond jubilee weekend celebrations.

References

1809 births
1860 deaths
Members of the Parliament of the United Kingdom for Scottish constituencies
Younger sons of dukes
British landlords
Scottish Tory MPs (pre-1912)
UK MPs 1835–1837